Chryseobacterium rhizoplanae is a Gram-negative and rod-shaped bacterium from the genus of Chryseobacterium which has been isolated from the rhizoplane environment of a field with maize (Zea mays) in Tallassee in the United States.

References

Further reading

External links
Type strain of Chryseobacterium rhizoplanae at BacDive -  the Bacterial Diversity Metadatabase

rhizoplanae
Bacteria described in 2015